Champion Thomas is a 1990 Indian Malayalam-language film directed and produced by Rex and written by Jagathy Sreekumar. The film stars Sreekumar, Sreeja, Sunny Augustine, Innocent and Mukesh. The film has musical score by M. G. Radhakrishnan.

Plot

Velayudhan leads a normal life until he is discharged from hospital after curing of TB. On the way to his home he encounters strange spiritual strength of deceased Thomas and gains his athletic personality. He reaches home and leads normal life until he is noticed with this strange physical strength which gets his family in trouble. He is now admitted in mental hospital against his wishes. In the meanwhile the bereaved wife of Thomas is being cajoled to marry Dr Mathews who is treating Velayudhan. Thomas spirit is awakened and warns Mathews to help Velayudhan by allowing him to compete in athletics and win against his arch rival.  His wish is granted and Velayudhan wins the memorial athletics competition and subsequently Thomas relieves him of his spirit.

Cast

Jagathy Sreekumar as Velayudhan
Sreeja as Selin
Sunny Augustine as Thomas George
Innocent as Dr. Unnithan
Mukesh as Dr. Mathews
Thilakan as PC Nair
Nedumudi Venu as Madhavan
Aranmula Ponnamma
Bobby Kottarakkara as Paramu
Janardanan
Kanakalatha
Mamukkoya
Philomina
Ajayan Adoor as Raghavan

Soundtrack
The music was composed by M. G. Radhakrishnan and the lyrics were written by K Jayakumar.

References

External links
 

1990 films
1990s Malayalam-language films